Secretaría de Recreación y Deportes Francisco "Pancho" Coimbre is a sports complex, located on Avenida Las Americas in Ponce, Puerto Rico. It features a 3-story gymnasium building, a gazebo, and a natatorium. It was named "Francisco 'Pancho' Coimbre" in April 1990 in honor of the Ponce baseball star.

History
The idea of a sports complex was conceived by three Ponce athletes, sports enthusiasts and then Oficina Municipal de Deportes (Municipal Sports Bureau). José Antonnetti, Pedro and Jorge Negron Archeval are names that will be linked to the Secretaria de Recreacion y Deportes and the history of Ponce sports. Ten years later, in 1990, the main building was named after Francisco "Pancho" Coimbre, to the memory of the Ponce baseball player. On 7 February 1980, construction work was completed for the structure to house the administrative headquarters and recreational facilities of the Secretaría de Recreación y Deportes of the municipality of Ponce. Ten years after its opening, in April 1990, it was named "Francisco 'Pancho' Coimbre" in honor of the Ponce baseball star.

Location
The building is located at the southwest corner of Avenida Las Americas and PR-2 in Ponce, Puerto Rico. The facilities were inaugurated on 10 February 1980. Its location next to Estadio Paquito Montaner and Coliseo Pachín Vicéns turned the area into the professional sports campus of the city.

References

Further reading
Carmelo Rosario Natal. Ponce En Su Historia Moderna: 1945-2002.  Published by Secretaría de Cultura y Turismo of the Government of the Autonomous Municipality of Ponce. Ponce, Puerto Rico. 2003. p. 147-148.

Athletics (track and field) venues in Puerto Rico
1980 in Puerto Rico
1980 establishments in Puerto Rico
Sports venues in Ponce, Puerto Rico